"I Got You Babe / Soda Pop" is a double A-side Christmas release by the cast of the comedy programme, Bo' Selecta, in which Leigh Francis performs as Craig David and Avid Merrion. "I Got You Babe" is a cover of the Sonny & Cher original, and features Merrion, Davina McCall and Patsy Kensit performing. "Soda Pop" is a mock single 'recorded' by Craig David. The single was released in December 2004, peaking at #5 on the UK Singles Chart.

Track listing

Charts

References

2004 singles
British Christmas songs
Songs written by Sonny Bono